The 2007 Oklahoma State Cowboys football team represented Oklahoma State University during the 2007 NCAA Division I FBS football season. The team participated as members of the Big 12 Conference in the South Division. They played their home games at Boone Pickens Stadium in Stillwater, Oklahoma and were coached by Mike Gundy.

Personnel

Coaching staff
Head coach: Mike Gundy
Assistants: Nelson Barnes, Tim Beckman, Todd Bradford, Joe DeForest, Larry Fedora, Curtis Luper, Doug Meacham, Joe Wickline

Schedule

Game summaries

Nebraska

Source: ESPN
    
    
    
    
    
    
    
    
    

Oklahoma State's first win in Lincoln since 1960.

Awards
All-Big 12: Adarius Bowman (2nd), Dave Koenig (2nd), Nathan Peterson (2nd), Brandon Pettigrew (1st), Dantrell Savage (1st)

2007 team players in the NFL
No one from the Cowboys was selected in the 2008 NFL Draft. 
 Julius Crosslin was signed as an undrafted free agent by the Dallas Cowboys. 
 Dantrell Savage was signed as an undrafted free agent by the Kansas City Chiefs. 
 Donovan Woods was signed as an undrafted free agent by the Pittsburgh Steelers.

References

Oklahoma State
Oklahoma State Cowboys football seasons
Guaranteed Rate Bowl champion seasons
Oklahoma State Cowboys football